Jin Xian (born 11 July 1991) is a Chinese footballer of Korean descent who currently plays for China League Two side Yanbian Beiguo.

Club career
Jin Xian started his professional football career in 2011 when he was promoted to Yanbian FC's first squad. On 30 October 2016, Jin made his Super League debut in the first match of 2016 season against Hangzhou Greentown.

On 9 January 2018, Jin transferred to China League Two side Yanbian Beiguo.

Career statistics
Statistics accurate as of match played 12 October 2019.

Honours
Yanbian Changbaishan 
 China League One: 2015

References

1991 births
Living people
Chinese footballers
People from Yanbian
Yanbian Funde F.C. players
Chinese Super League players
China League One players
Chinese people of Korean descent
Association football defenders